Cooley may refer to:
Cooley (surname), a surname (and a list of people with the surname)
Cooley Distillery, an Irish whiskey distillery
Cooley LLP, a Silicon Valley-based law firm
Cooley Peninsula, Ireland
Cooley High School, Detroit, Michigan, USA
Thomas M. Cooley Law School, Lansing, Michigan, USA
McNary, Arizona, formerly known as Cooley
Cooley, County Tyrone, a townland in County Tyrone, Northern Ireland

See also
Cooley High, a 1975 film produced by American International Pictures
Cooley v. Board of Wardens (53 U.S. 299) (1853), a United States Supreme Court case regarding shipping
Táin Bó Cúailnge (Cattle Raid of Cooley), a central tale in the Ulster Cycle of Irish mythology
Birch Cooley Township, Minnesota, in Renville County, Minnesota, USA
 Cowley (disambiguation)
 Coley (disambiguation)
 Colley (disambiguation)
 Coolie, an Asian slave or a racial slur
 Cooley Mountains, Cooley Peninsula, County Louth, Ireland